The Premier of Bermuda serves as head of government of Bermuda, under appointment by the Governor of Bermuda, in the governor's capacity as representative in Bermuda of the British monarch, currently King Charles III. The position was created by Bermuda's 1968 Constitution.

Since 19 July 2017, the Premier has been Edward David Burt, the leader of the Progressive Labour Party.

List

(Dates in italics indicate de facto continuation of office)

See also
List of current heads of government in the United Kingdom and dependencies
Governor of Bermuda
Lists of office-holders

References

External links
Office of the Premier

Bermuda, Premiers of
Premiers
Main|Premiers